The Merchant Marine Distinguished Service Medal is a decoration of the United States Merchant Marine (USMM).  The decoration is the highest award which can be bestowed upon members of that service. It is awarded to any seaman in the USMM who, on or after September 3, 1939, has distinguished himself during the war by outstanding conduct or service in the line of duty.  Regulations state that not more than one medal shall be issued to any one seaman, but for each succeeding instance sufficient to justify the award of a medal, there will be awarded a suitable insignia to be worn with the medal.

As the Merchant Marine Distinguished Service Medal is considered a federal service decoration, it may be worn on the uniforms of active, reserve and retired uniformed service members.

Design notes and description 
Designed by Paul Manship, subsequent awards of the medal are represented by 5/16th inch gold stars affixed to both the suspension ribbon and the ribbon bar.  Original awards have P. M. on the reverse of the suspension device.

The medal is in gold-plate with a diameter of 41.9mm.  It is composed of a silver 8-point ball tip star superimposed on a gold compass with a square eagle-anchor suspension device.  The ribbon is blue, white, red, white, blue.

Recipients

United States Merchant Marine Academy awardees
The first medal was awarded to Edwin F. Cheney on October 8, 1942 by Franklin D. Roosevelt at the White House with Admiral Emery S. Land as documented by Lowell Thomas in his book These Men Shall Never Die.

Captain Paul Buck
Midshipman Francis A. Dales
Midshipman Elmer C. Donnelly
Midshipman Edwin Joseph O'Hara - awarded posthumously
Midshipman Walter G. Sittmann
Midshipman William M. Thomas, Jr.
Midshipman Phil Cox Vannais
Midshipman Frederick R. Zito
Midshipman Carl M. Medved
Third Mate Edward Michael Fetherston
Third Mate Michael J. Hainen, September 1991

SS Mayaguez incident
First Officer Clinton Harriman
Third Officer Karl Lonsdale
Yeoman Storekeeper Robert Griffin,
2nd Asst. Engineer Michael Saltwick
Fireman Watertender Hermino Rivera
Oiler Epifanio Rodriguez

In addition, the above six Mariners were also awarded the Navy Distinguished Civilian Service Award.

Other awardees
Captain Elis R. Johanson
Third Officer Frederick August Larsen Jr.
Chief Engineer Albert M. Boe
Chief Engineer Thomas J. McTaggart 
Radio Operator Kenneth W. Maynard
Master Paul H. Browne

See also 
 Awards and decorations of the United States government
 Awards and Decorations of the United States Maritime Administration
 Awards and decorations of the United States Merchant Marine
 Awards and decorations of the United States Armed Forces
 Distinguished Service Medal (disambiguation)

References

External links
 Laws Establishing Merchant Marine Medals
 Manship sculpture of medal's obverse at the Smithsonian Institution
 Manship sculpture of medal's reverse at the Smithsonian Institution

Awards and decorations of the United States Merchant Marine
Awards established in 1942
Works by Paul Manship